ZZN may refer to:

 Zozlan railway station, Pakistan Railways code
 Nationaltheatret station, Oslo, Norway, IATA code
 WZZN ("97.7 The Zone"), a radio station broadcasting to Huntsville, Alabama